Look Alive may refer to:

Look Alive (Guster album) or the title song, 2019
Look Alive, an EP by We Are the Ocean, or the title song, 2009
Look Alive, a video by Incubus, 2007
"Look Alive" (BlocBoy JB song), 2018
"Look Alive" (Rae Sremmurd song), 2016